Porters is a British television sitcom that aired on Dave from 20 September 2017 through 2019. The series is set in the fictional St. Etheldreda's hospital, and was created by former medic Dan Sefton. The series stars Edward Easton, Susan Wokoma, Claudia Jessie, Rutger Hauer and Daniel Mays. The first series of three episodes began on 20 September 2017. A second series of six episodes began airing on 14 March 2019.

Cast and characters

Main 

 Edward Easton as Simon Porter
 Susan Wokoma as Frankie
 Daniel Mays as Anthony De La Mer (Series 2)
 Claudia Jessie as Lucy
 Rutger Hauer as Tillman
 Sanjeev Bhaskar as Mr. Pradeep
 Sinead Keenan as Dr Batholomew (Series 2)
 Tanya Franks as Jane Bison
 Jo Joyner as Dr Kelly (Series 1)

Recurring 

 James Atherton as Dr. McKenzie
 Siobhán McSweeney as Alice
 Jo Enright as Janice
 Toby Williams as Terry

Guest 

 Mathew Horne  as Mark
 Kelsey Grammer as Mendel
 Samantha Spiro as Rebecca
 Jamie Foreman as Alan McNally
 Christine Ozanne as Gladys
 Kiano Samuels as Lewis
 Chetan Pathak as Clinton Carrack
 Wendy Mae Brown as Mrs. Jerome
 Jonathan Hansler as Barman
 Neil Stuke as Hutch
 Ekow Quartey as Billy Tarsal
 Jacob Edwards as Dr. A Friend
 Souad Faress as Freda
 David Yip as Dalai Lama
 Sophie McShera as Pippa (Orc)
 Whitney O'Nicholas as Frankie's Sister
 Caron Pascoe as Mrs Weig
 Rich Keeble as PC Mortimer
 Marc Warren as Graham Post
 Olayinka Giwa as Policeman
 Laura Checkley as WPC Newman
 Patrick Turpin as Ham
 Scott Chambers as Cheese
 Naomi Sheldon as Nurse
 Bobby Pearse as Ten-Year-Old Simon
 Sally Lindsay as Linda (Simon's Mum)
 Sanjeev Kohli as Muzz
 Bryony Hannah as Penny
 Paul Longley as David
 Jon Glover as Howard
 Chris Wilson as Doctor
 Chiedu Agborh as Surgical Team Member

Episodes

Series 1 (2017)

Series 2 (2019) 
In April 2018, it was announced that Porters had been renewed for a second series of six episodes.

References

External links 

 
 

2017 British television series debuts
2019 British television series endings
2010s British sitcoms
British fantasy television series
Dave (TV channel) original programming
English-language television shows